Tonga baskets are baskets woven by the Tonga women of the Southern Province of Zambia, who are renowned for their basket weaving. The baskets have a distinctive design with a square bottom forming the foundation of the basket.

It takes approximately two weeks to complete a basket about 35 cm in diameter. The baskets are made from the ilala palm (mapokwe in Tonga), which, although growing freely, is also planted by Tonga women for the purpose of basket making.  This re-planting became standard practice in the late 1980s with the opening of the Tonga Craft Centre in Binga village, Zimbabwe a centre funded by the Danish government, which exported thousands of baskets a year. This craft centre was meant to keep the traditional crafts alive: basket-making, drum-making, carving, pottery, and beading. The Tonga live in an area prone to drought and poverty, and the basket making helped the women feed their families.

Traditionally, the baskets were (and still are) used for carrying maize or sorghum from the fields and then winnowing the grain. Traditional designs includes stripes, a spider web type pattern and a lightning pattern.

References

Basket weaving
Zambian culture
Southern Province, Zambia